Jacqueline Alex (later Kiewel, born 1 December 1965) is a retired German swimmer. In 1985 she won a national title and a European gold medal in the 200 m butterfly at the European championships.

After retiring from swimming she worked as a physiotherapist at her own company.

References

1965 births
Living people
People from Zwickau
East German female swimmers
East German female butterfly swimmers
European Aquatics Championships medalists in swimming
Sportspeople from Saxony